AFC Wimbledon is an English professional association football club, based at Plough Lane in Wimbledon, Greater London. The club was formed on 30 May 2002 by supporters of Wimbledon Football Club, led by Kris Stewart, Marc Jones and Trevor Williams who strongly opposed the decision of an independent commission appointed by the FA to allow the relocation of Wimbledon F.C. to Milton Keynes, to be subsequently rebranded as MK Dons.

The club was accepted into the Combined Counties League for the 2002–03 season and proceeded to rise through the non-League system, winning five promotions in nine seasons to return to the Football League less than a decade after the original Wimbledon Football Club had still been competing in the top flight of English football. AFC Wimbledon’s average home attendance at league fixtures for their first season exceeded 3,000 – higher than the average attendance in the same season of Wimbledon F.C., who were still playing in the First Division (now the Football League Championship).

This list encompasses the major honours won by AFC Wimbledon and records set by the club, its managers and its players. The player records section includes details of the club's leading goalscorers and those who have made the most competitive first-team appearances. The club's attendance records are also included in the list.

As of 2020, AFC Wimbledon still hold the record for the longest run of unbeaten league games at any level of senior football in the United Kingdom. The club remained unbeaten for 78 league matches between 26 February 2003 (a 3–1 away win at Chessington United) and 27 November 2004 (a 2–1 away win at Bashley).

The club's record appearance maker is defender Barry Fuller, who made 233 appearances in all competitions between 2013 and 2018 and the club's record goalscorer is Kevin Cooper, who scored 104 goals in 99 appearances in all competitions between 2002 and 2004.

Honours
Following the move of Wimbledon F.C. to Milton Keynes and its rebranding as Milton Keynes Dons, there was much debate over the rightful home of all the honours won by Wimbledon F.C.. Former supporters argued that the trophies won by Wimbledon F.C. rightfully belong to the community of Wimbledon and should be returned to the local area. AFC Wimbledon believe that the honours of Wimbledon F.C. belong to the fans, as illustrated by the following statement on the club's official website:

In October 2006, an agreement was reached between Milton Keynes Dons F.C., the MK Dons Supporters Association, the Wimbledon Independent Supporters Association and the Football Supporters Federation. The replica of the FA Cup plus all club patrimony gathered under the name of Wimbledon F.C. would be returned to the London Borough of Merton. Ownership of trademarks and website domain names related to Wimbledon F.C. would also be transferred to the Borough. It was also agreed that any reference made to Milton Keynes Dons F.C. should refer only to events after 7 August 2004, the date of the first league match played as Milton Keynes Dons. As a result of this deal, the Football Supporters Federation announced that the supporters of Milton Keynes Dons would be permitted to become members of the federation, and that it would no longer appeal to the supporters of other clubs to boycott MK Dons matches. The replica trophies and Wimbledon F.C. memorabilia were returned to Merton on 2 August 2007.

Honours
Only honours won by AFC Wimbledon are listed here. For a list of honours won by Wimbledon F.C., see Wimbledon F.C. Honours

League honours
 Football League
 League Two
 Play-off Winners (1): 2015–16
 Football Conference
 Conference National
 Play-off Winners (1): 2010–11
 Conference South
 Champions (1): 2008–09
 Isthmian League
 Premier Division
 Play-off Winners (1): 2007–08
 Division One
 Champions (1): 2004–05
Combined Counties League
 Premier Division
 Champions (1): 2003–04

Cups and Trophies
Combined Counties League Premier Challenge Cup
 Winners (1): 2003–04

Minor honours
Lanes Cup
 Winners (2): 2007–08 2011–12
London Senior Cup
 Winners (1): 2013–14
 Runners-up (1): 2009–10
Supporters Direct Cup
 Winners (3): 2002–03 2005–06 2009–10
 Runners-up (3): 2004–05 2006–07 2008–09
Surrey Senior Cup
 Winners (1): 2004–05
 Runners-up (1): 2005–06

Players

Most league appearances

Football League era (2011–present)
The following table shows the 10 players who have made the most appearances for AFC Wimbledon in Football League matches as well as all major Football League cup competitions in descending order. The statistics only incorporate appearances made by players since AFC Wimbledon gained promotion to the Football League in 2011. In instances where two players have the same total number of appearances, higher number of total starts shall be given precedence when determining ranking. The figure in parentheses is the number of appearances made by a player as a substitute. The figures also take into account appearances made by players whilst they were on loan to AFC Wimbledon from a parent club.

Non–League Football era (2002–2011)
The following table shows the players who have made 100 appearances or more for AFC Wimbledon in semi-professional league matches (spanning from the Combined Counties Premier League up until the Conference National) as well as in all major Non–League cup competitions (including the Combined Counties League Premier Challenge Cup, the Isthmian League Cup and the Conference League Cup) in descending order. The statistics only incorporate appearances made by players prior to AFC Wimbledon gaining promotion to the Football League in 2011. In instances where two players have the same total number of appearances, league appearances shall be given precedence when determining ranking. The figure in parentheses is the number of appearances made by a player as a substitute.

Top scorers

Football League era (2011–present)
The following table shows the 10 players who have scored the most goals for AFC Wimbledon in all Football League matches as well as all major Football League cup competitions in descending order. The statistics only incorporate appearances and goals made by players since AFC Wimbledon gained promotion to the Football League in 2011. In instances where two players have the same total goal tally, lower number of total appearances shall be given precedence when determining ranking. The figure in parentheses shows the total number of appearances made in relation to goals scored. The figures also take into account appearances made by players whilst they were on loan to AFC Wimbledon from a parent club.

Non–League Football era (2002–2011)
The following table charts the club's top scorers in all semi-professional league matches from the Combined Counties Premier League up until the Conference National as well as in all major Non–League cup competitions (including the Combined Counties League Premier Challenge Cup, the Isthmian League Cup and the Conference League Cup) in descending order. The statistics only incorporate appearances and goals made by players prior to AFC Wimbledon gaining promotion to the Football League in 2011. In instances where two players have the same total goal tally, league goals shall be given precedence when determining ranking. Only players with 20 goals or more in all competitions have been included. The figure in parentheses shows the total number of appearances made in relation to goals scored.

Top Scorer by season

Non-League Top Scorers by season (2002–2011)
The following table lists all top scorers for AFC Wimbledon by season. The statistics incorporate results for league matches and results in all major Non-League Cup competitions (including the Combined Counties League Premier Challenge Cup, the Isthmian League Cup and the Conference League Cup as well as results in the FA Vase, the FA Trophy and the FA Cup. The figure in parentheses gives the total number of appearances made by the player in that competition during the season in which they became top scorer.

Football League Top Scorers by season (2011–present)
The following table lists all top scorers for AFC Wimbledon by season. The statistics incorporate results for league matches and results in all major Football League Cup competitions (including the Football League Cup and Football League Trophy as well as the FA Cup. The figure in parentheses gives the total number of appearances made by the player in that competition during the season in which they became top scorer.

Club Captain
The following table lists every player that has ever been appointed to act as the Club Captain since AFC Wimbledon's inaugural season.

Player of the Year
The following table lists every player that has been voted as 'Player of the Year' by The Wimbledon Independent Supporters Association (WISA) since the club's inaugural season. The (c) symbol signifies that a player was selected to act as club captain during the season in which they won the award. Names written in italics signify that a player was also AFC Wimbledon's league top scorer during the season in which they were elected Player of the Year.

Young Player of the Year
The following table lists every player that has been voted 'Young Player of the Year' in the club's history. In order to be eligible to win the Natalie Callow Memorial Trophy players must be aged 21 or under at the start of the season in which they are nominated for the award. Names written in italics signify that a player was also AFC Wimbledon's league top scorer during the season in which they were elected Player of the Year. Names written in bold signify that players are still active members of the AFC Wimbledon senior squad.

Team of the Year
The following AFC Wimbledon players were selected for the honour of being named in the 'Team of the Year' for their respective league based on consistently high performances throughout a given season.

Non-League Football Era (2002–2011)

Conference Premier Team of the Year

Managers

Managerial Statistics

These statistics incorporate results for league matches (including Play-off matches) and results in all major League Cup competitions (including the Combined Counties League Premier Challenge Cup, the Isthmian League Cup, the Conference League Cup, the Football League Cup and the Football League Trophy) as well as results in the FA Vase, the FA Trophy and the FA Cup.

Caretaker managers are shown in italics, with Simon Bassey serving two stints in the role.

* suspended as manager on 13 February but not officially dismissed until 18 February 2004.
# suspended as manager on 25 September but not officially dismissed until 20 October 2019.'

Honours
The following is a list of all AFC Wimbledon managers to date who have ever won a league promotion or major trophy during their tenure.Caretaker managers are shown in italics.Team Records
Undoubtedly the club's greatest record to date is securing 5 promotions in 9 seasons, believed to be the fastest ascent for any English football club.
Chief executive Erik Samuelson said that the club has always planned a return to the top flights of English football: "I was clearing out some old files the other day and found a five-year plan from the first season and we assumed promotion every other year. It never occurred to us that we wouldn't succeed. We didn't expect it but always believed we would do what the old Wimbledon did and we have."

Matches
 First Non-League Match: 1–2 win v Sandhurst Town, 17 August 2002.
 First FA Vase Match: 2–7 win v Westfield, 6 September 2003.
 First FA Cup Match: 3–0 win v Ashford Town, 4 September 2004.
 First FA Trophy Match: 2–0 win v Metropolitan Police, 9 October 2004.
 First Football League Match: 2–3 loss v Bristol Rovers, 6 August 2011.
 First Football League Cup Match: 3–2 loss v Crawley Town, 29 July 2011.
 First Football League Trophy Match: 2–2 draw v Stevenage (ending as a 4–3 win following a penalty shoot-out), 4 October 2011.

Scorelines
 Record league home victory: 9–0 v Slough Town, 31 March 2007 in the Isthmian League Premier Division.
 Record league home defeat: 0–4 v Southend United, 20 November 2012 in Football League Two.
 Record league away victory: 0–9 v Chessington United, 14 February 2004 in the Combined Counties League Premier Division.
 Record league away defeat: 5–0 v York City, 7 April 2010 in the Conference Premier.

Points
 Most points gained in a season: 130 in 46 matches during the 2003–04 season in the Combined Counties League Premier Division.
 Fewest points gained in a season: 37 in 46 matches during the 2021-22 season in Football League One, 35 in 35 matches during the 2019-20 season in Football League One (shortened due to the COVID-19 Pandemic)

Streaks
 Longest unbeaten league run: 78 matches, from 26 February 2003 to 27 November 2004 (the longest unbeaten run of league matches recorded in all of English senior men's football).
 Longest winning streak (League): 32 matches, from 18 March 2003 to 7 January 2004.
 Longest drawing streak (League): 4 matches, from 3 January 2011 to 18 January 2011.
 Longest losing streak (League): 6 matches, from 26 November 2011 to 2 January 2012/5 March 2022 to 2 April 2022
 Longest streak without a win (League): 27 matches, from 11 December 2021 to 30 April 2022 (end of the season).
 Longest scoring run (League): 32 matches, from 18 March 2003 to 7 January 2004.
 Longest run without scoring (League): 4 matches, from 29 December 2021 to 18 January 2022.
 Longest run without conceding a goal (League): 7 matches, from 27 March 2004 to 21 April 2004.

Seasonal Results
 Most league wins in a season: 42 – 2003–04
 Fewest league wins in a season: 6 – 2021-22
 Most league draws in a season: 19 – 2021-22
 Fewest league draws in a season: 3 – 2002–03
 Most league losses in a season: 22 – 2011–12, 2018-19
 Fewest league losses in a season: 0 – 2003–04

Goals
 Most league goals scored in a season: 180 – 2003–04
 Fewest league goals scored in a season: 49 – 2021-22, 39 in COVID-19 shortened 2019-20 season
 Most league goals conceded in a season: 76 – 2012–13
 Fewest league goals conceded in a season: 32 – 2003–04

Attendance records
Largest home attendance for a league match:  8,568 vs Sutton United on 15 October 2022 in EFL League Two.
Smallest home attendance for a league match: 1,939 vs Ashford Town on 21 November 2006 in the Isthmian League Premier Division.
Largest away attendance for a league match: 30,424 vs Sunderland on 2 February 2019 in Football League One.
Smallest away attendance for a league match: 473 vs Leyton on 8 September 2007 in the Isthmian League Premier Division.

Average attendance

Only includes attendances at league home fixtures, rounded to one decimal place; number in brackets is change in % from previous season.

Player records
 Most league appearances: 197 (including substitute appearances), by Sam Hatton between May 2007 and May 2012.
 Most appearances overall: 241 (including starting appearances and substitutions in all competitions), by Sam Hatton between May 2007 and May 2012.
 Most league goals in a season: 53, by Kevin Cooper during 2003–04 in the Combined Counties League Premier Division.
 Most goals in a season overall: 66, by Kevin Cooper during 2003–04 in the Combined Counties League Premier Division.
 Most league goals overall: 90, by Kevin Cooper in 87 appearances (including starting appearances and substitutions), between August 2002 and May 2004.
 First player to score a goal: Glenn Mulcaire, on 17 July 2002 in a pre-season friendly against Bromley, which ultimately ended as a 2–1 defeat.
 First player to score a league goal: Kevin Cooper, on 17 August 2002 in a 2–1 away victory at Sandhurst Town in the Combined Counties League Premier Division.
 First player to score a goal in the Football League: Jamie Stuart, on 6 August 2011 in a 3–2 defeat to Bristol Rovers in Football League Two.
 First player to score a goal in the Football League Cup: Luke Moore, on 29 July 2011 in a 3–2 defeat to Crawley Town in Football League Two.
 First player to score a goal in the Football League Trophy: Sam Hatton, on 4 October 2011 in a 2–2 draw (ending as a 4–3 win on penalties) against Stevenage in Football League Two.
 First player to score a hat-trick: Ally Russell, on 26 October 2002 in a 4–0 win over Cobham in the Combined Counties League Premier Division.
 First player to receive a yellow card in a league match: Simon Bassey, on 21 August 2002 in a 2–1 loss to Chipstead in the Combined Counties League Premier Division.
 First player to receive a red card in a league match: Keith Ward, on 26 August 2002 in a 3–2 loss to Ash United in the Combined Counties League Premier Division.
 Player with the greatest number of hat-tricks: Kevin Cooper, with 13 between August 2002 and May 2004.
 Player with the greatest number of league goals in a single match: Kevin Cooper, scoring 4 in an 8–0 win over Cove 21 April 2004 in the Combined Counties League Premier Division.
 Player with the fastest league goal: Sammy Moore, scoring after just 11 seconds of play in a 5–2 win over Mansfield Town on 5 October 2010 in the Conference Premier.
 Highest transfer fee paid: Undisclosed (in excess of the £25,000 previously paid for Jon Main) paid to Stevenage for Byron Harrison.
 Highest transfer fee received: Undisclosed (believed to be £150,000) paid by Bradford City for Jake Reeves.

Penalty shoot-outsList incomplete''

References

Further reading
 

Records And Statistics
AFC Wimbledon